The Battle of the Bismarck Sea (2–4 March 1943) took place in the South West Pacific Area (SWPA) during World War II. During the course of the battle, aircraft of the U.S. 5th Air Force and the Royal Australian Air Force (RAAF) attacked a Japanese convoy that was carrying troops to Lae, New Guinea. Most of the task force was destroyed, and Japanese troop losses were heavy.

Japanese forces 
Rear Admiral Masatomi Kimura

Destroyers 
Rear Admiral Masatomi Kimura

Transports 
Captain Kamataro Matsumoto

Embarked units

Air units

Allied forces

Allied air forces
Commander, Allied Air Forces, Southwest Pacific Area/US Fifth Air Force Lieutenant General George C. Kenney

Advanced Echelon, Allied Air Forces Major General Ennis C. Whitehead

No. 9 Operational Group RAAF
Air Commodore J. E. Hewitt

Motor Torpedo Boat Striking Force 
Lieutenant Commander Barry K. Atkins

Notes

References 

World War II orders of battle